Jean-Marie Colombani (born 7 July 1948 in Dakar, Senegal) is a French journalist, and was the editor-in-chief of the daily newspaper Le Monde from 1994 until 2007.

Biography
Educated at Panthéon-Assas University and Science-Po, he is the author of the lead article published after the New York City terrorist attacks of September 11, 2001 on the front page of his newspaper, entitled "We are All Americans". In 2004 Colombani co-authored with Walter Wells, editor of the International Herald Tribune, the volume Dangerous De-Liaisons : What's Really behind the War between France and the U.S. (published by Melville House Publishing). From 2005 he has been part of the board of directors of La Stampa. In 1999 he received the Ischia International Journalism Award. He has been a member of Le Siècle. He is a member of the Fondation Ecologie d'Avenir.

Decorations 
 Chevalier of the Legion of Honour (2015)

References

External links
 http://www.worldpress.org/1101we_are_all_americans.htm

1948 births
Living people
Sciences Po alumni
French newspaper editors
People from Dakar
University of Paris alumni
French people of Corsican descent
Lycée Hoche alumni
Paris 2 Panthéon-Assas University alumni
French male non-fiction writers
Chevaliers of the Légion d'honneur
Recipients of Ischia International Journalism Award